Undibacterium macrobrachii is a Gram-negative, strictly aerobic and motile bacterium from the genus of Undibacterium with a single polar flagellum which has been isolated from water from a pond which was cultivated with shrimps from Pingtung in Taiwan.

References

Burkholderiales
Bacteria described in 2014